Chetan Singh Choudhary, also known as Chetan Dudi, is an Indian politician from Rajasthan. He is a member of the 15th Assembly of Rajasthan representing the Deedwana constituency as an Indian National Congress nominee.

Political career
Chetan Dudi began his political career in the late 2009, and was elected President of Nagaur Youth Congress in November of the same year. He was elected for the same position for the second time in February 2013. 10 years from 2009 to 2019. 

Dudi contested and won the Member of Legislative Assembly election from Deedwana constituency in 2018 with 92,981 (56.01%) votes. He defeated Jintendra Singh of Bharatiya Janata Party.

He was State Secretary of Rajasthan Congress from 22 December 2014 to July 2020.

References

1979 births
People from Rajasthan
Indian National Congress politicians
Rajasthan MLAs 2018–2023
Living people
Indian National Congress politicians from Rajasthan